Langmeing is a village in Mon district of Nagaland state of India.

References

Villages in Mon district